Archisopha is a genus of moth in the family Cosmopterigidae. It contains only one species, Archisopha foliosa, which is found in Sri Lanka.

References

External links
Natural History Museum Lepidoptera genus database

Cosmopteriginae
Monotypic moth genera
Moths of Sri Lanka